HCT may refer to:

Colleges
 Hadassah College of Technology, now Hadassah Academic College in Jerusalem, Israel
 Higher College of Technology, in Muscat, Oman
 Higher Colleges of Technology, in the United Arab Emirates
 Herefordshire College of Technology, now Herefordshire and Ludlow College, in England

Health and medicine
 Healthcare technician
 Hematocrit
 Hydrochlorothiazide
 Hematopoietic cell transplantation

Organisations
 Herpetological Conservation Trust
 Hertfordshire Community NHS Trust

Places
 Huncoat railway station, in England

Other uses 
 Hardware Compatibility Test
 HCT Co., Ltd. a South Korean compliance testing and calibration company
 HCT Group, a bus operator in London
 HCMOS, HCT is a variation of HCMOS integrated circuit logic
 74HCT-series integrated circuits, a logic family of integrated circuits